Quintin McGarel Hogg, Baron Hailsham of St Marylebone,  (9 October 1907 – 12 October 2001), known as the 2nd Viscount Hailsham between 1950 and 1963, at which point he disclaimed his hereditary peerage, was a British barrister and Conservative Party politician who served as Lord Chancellor from 1970 to 1974 and again from 1979 to 1987.

Like his father, Hailsham was considered to be a contender for the leadership of the Conservative Party. He was a contender to succeed Harold Macmillan as prime minister in 1963, renouncing his hereditary peerage to do so, but was passed over in favour of the Earl of Home. He was created a life peer in 1970 and served as Lord Chancellor, the office formerly held by his father, in 1970-74 and 1979–87.

Background
Born in London, Hogg was the son of Douglas Hogg, 1st Viscount Hailsham, who was Lord Chancellor under Stanley Baldwin, and grandson of Quintin Hogg, a merchant, philanthropist and educational reformer, and an American mother.

Hogg was educated at Sunningdale School and then Eton College, where he was a King's Scholar and won the Newcastle Scholarship in 1925. He entered Christ Church, Oxford as a Scholar and he was President of the Oxford University Conservative Association and of the Oxford Union. He took Firsts in Honours Moderations in 1928 and in Literae Humaniores in 1930. He was elected to a Prize Fellowship in Law at All Souls College, Oxford, in 1931. He was called to the bar by Lincoln's Inn in 1932.

The middle name McGarel comes from Charles McGarel, who had large holdings of slaves, and  who financially sponsored Quintin Hogg's grandfather, also called Quintin Hogg, who was McGarel's brother-in-law.

Hogg spoke in opposition to the motion "That this House will in no circumstances fight for its King and Country" in the 1933 King and Country debate at the Oxford Union.

Politics and Second World War 
Hogg participated in his first election campaign in the 1924 general election, and all subsequent general election campaigns until his death. In 1938, Hogg was chosen as a candidate for Parliament in the Oxford by-election. This election took place shortly after the Munich Agreement and the Labour candidate Patrick Gordon Walker was persuaded to step down to allow a unified challenge to the Conservatives; A. D. Lindsay, the Master of Balliol College fought as an 'Independent Progressive' candidate. Hogg narrowly defeated Lindsay, who was said to be horrified by the popular slogan of "Hitler wants Hogg".

Hogg voted against Neville Chamberlain in the Norway Debate of May 1940, and supported Winston Churchill. He served briefly in the desert campaign as a platoon commander with the Rifle Brigade during the Second World War. His commanding officer had been his contemporary at Eton; after him and the second-in-command, Hogg was the third-oldest officer in the battalion. After a knee wound in August 1941, which almost cost him his right leg, Hogg was deemed too old for further front-line service, and later served on the staff of General "Jumbo" Wilson before leaving the army with the rank of major. In the run-up to the 1945 election, Hogg wrote a response to the book Guilty Men, called The Left Was Never Right.

Conservative minister
Hogg's father died in 1950 and Hogg entered the House of Lords, succeeding his father as the second Viscount Hailsham. Believing his political career to be over he concentrated on his career at the bar for some years, taking silk in 1953 and becoming head of his barristers' chambers in 1955, succeeding to Kenneth Diplock. When the Conservatives returned to power under Churchill in 1951, he refused to be considered for office. In 1956, he refused appointment as Postmaster-General under Anthony Eden on financial grounds, only to accept appointment as First Lord of the Admiralty six weeks later. His appointment, however, had to be delayed because of the Crabb affair.

As First Lord, Hailsham was briefed about Eden's plans to use military force against Egypt, which he thought were 'madness'. Nevertheless, once Operation Musketeer had been launched, he thought that Britain could not retreat until the Suez Canal had been captured. When, in the middle of the operation, Lord Mountbatten of Burma threatened to resign as First Sea Lord in protest, Hailsham ordered him in writing to stay on duty: he believed that Mountbatten was entitled to be protected by his minister, and that he was bound to resign if the honour of the Navy was impaired by the conduct of the operation. Hailsham remained critical of the actions of the then Chancellor of the Exchequer, Harold Macmillan, during the crisis, believing that he had suffered from a failure of nerve.

Hailsham became Minister of Education in 1957 under Macmillan, holding the office for eight months, before accepting appointment as Lord President of the Council and Chairman of the Conservative Party in September 1957. During his term as Party Chairman, the Conservative Party won a notable victory in the 1959 general election, which it had been predicted to lose. Nevertheless, shortly after the election, Hailsham was sidelined, and was made Minister for Science and Technology, serving in that post until 1964. His tenure as Science Minister was successful, and he was later elected to the Royal Society under Statute 12 in 1973.

Concurrently, Hailsham was Lord Privy Seal between 1959 and 1960, Lord President of the Council between 1960 and 1964, and Leader of the House of Lords between 1960 and 1963, having been Deputy Leader between 1957 and 1960. He was also given a number of special assignments by Macmillan, becoming Minister with special responsibility for Sport from 1962 to 1964, for unemployment in the North-East between 1963 and 1964 and for higher education between 1963 and 1964. Hailsham, who had little interest in sports, thought little of his appointment as de facto Sports minister, later writing that "[t]he idea of a Minister for Sport has always appalled me. It savours of dictatorship and the nastiest kind of populist or Fascist dictatorship at that."

Hailsham appeared before the Wolfenden Committee to discuss homosexuality. The historian Patrick Higgins said that he used it as "an opportunity to express his disgust". He stated "The instinct of mankind to describe homosexual acts as "unnatural" is not based on mere prejudice" and that homosexuals were corrupting and "a proselytising religion".

In June 1963 when his fellow Minister John Profumo had to resign after admitting lying to Parliament about his private life, Hailsham attacked him savagely on television. The Labour MP Reginald Paget called this "a virtuoso performance of the art of kicking a friend in the guts". He added, "When self-indulgence has reduced a man to the shape of Lord Hailsham, sexual continence involves no more than a sense of the ridiculous". In July 15, he and Averell Harriman arrived in Moscow on nuclear test-ban negotiations.

Disclaimer of peerage and Conservative Party leadership bid 
Hailsham was Leader of the House of Lords when Harold Macmillan announced his sudden resignation from the premiership for health reasons at the start of the 1963 Conservative Party conference. At that time there was no formal ballot for the Conservative Party leadership. Hailsham, who was at first Macmillan's preferred successor, announced that he would use the newly enacted Peerage Act to disclaim his title and fight a by-election and return to the House of Commons. His publicity-seeking antics at the Party Conference (such as feeding his baby daughter in public, and allowing his supporters to distribute "Q" (for Quintin) badges) were considered vulgar at the time, so Macmillan did not encourage senior party members to choose him as his successor. 

Eventually, on the advice of Macmillan, The Queen chose the Earl of Home to succeed Macmillan as prime minister. Hailsham nevertheless renounced his peerage on 20 November 1963, becoming again Quintin Hogg. He was stood and was elected as MP for St Marylebone, his father's old constituency, in the 1963 St Marylebone by-election,

Hogg as a campaigner was known for his robust rhetoric and theatrical gestures. He was usually in good form in dealing with hecklers, a valuable skill in the 1960s, and was prominent in the 1964 general election. One evening when giving a political address, he was hailed by his supporters as he leaned over the lectern pointing at a long-haired heckler. He said, "Now, see here, Sir or Madam whichever the case might be, we have had enough of you!" The police ejected the man and the crowd applauded and Hogg went on as if nothing had happened. Another time, when a Labour Party supporter waved a Harold Wilson placard in front of him, Hogg smacked it with his walking-stick.

Lord Chancellorship 

Hogg served in the Conservative shadow cabinet during the Wilson government, and built up his practice at the bar where one of his clients was the Prime Minister and political opponent Harold Wilson. When Edward Heath won the 1970 general election he received a life peerage as Baron Hailsham of St Marylebone, of Herstmonceux in the County of Sussex, and became Lord Chancellor. Hogg was the first to return to the House of Lords as a life peer after having disclaimed an hereditary peerage. Hailsham's choice of Lord Widgery as Lord Chief Justice was criticised by his opponents, although he later redeemed himself in the eyes of the profession by appointing Lord Lane to succeed Widgery. His appointment as Lord Chancellor caused some amusement; in October 1962 he had told a journalist (Logan Gourlay of the Daily Express) that when he had inherited his title he had thought that by 1970 if the Tory Government were in power “some ass might make me Lord Chancellor”.

During his first term as Lord Chancellor, Hailsham oversaw the passage of the Courts Act 1971, which fundamentally reformed the English justice by abolishing the ancient assizes and quarter sessions, which were replaced by permanent Crown Courts. The Act also established a unified court service, under the responsibility of the Lord Chancellor's Department, which as a result expanded substantially. He also piloted through the House of Lords Heath's controversial Industrial Relations Act 1971, which established the short-lived National Industrial Relations Court.

Hailsham announced his retirement after the end of the Heath government in 1974. He popularised the term 'elective dictatorship' in 1976, later writing a detailed exposition, The Dilemma of Democracy. However, after the tragic death of his second wife in a riding accident, he decided to return to active politics, first as a Shadow Minister without Portfolio in the Shadow Cabinets of Edward Heath and Margaret Thatcher, then again as Lord Chancellor from 1979 to 1987 under Margaret Thatcher.

Hailsham was widely considered as a traditionalist Lord Chancellor. He put great emphasis on the traditional roles of his post, sitting on the Appellate Committee of the House of Lords more frequently than any of his post-war predecessors. Appointment of deputies to preside over the Lords enabled him to give more time to judicial work, although he often sat on the woolsack himself. He was protective of the English bar, opposing the appointment of solicitors to the High Court and the extension of their rights of audience. He was, however, responsible for implementing the far-reaching 1971 reform of the courts system, and championed law reform and the work of the Law Commission.

Retirement 
After his retirement, Hailsham vigorously opposed the Thatcher government's plans to reform the legal profession. He opposed the introduction of contingency fees, observing that the professions were "not like the grocer's shop at the corner of a street in a town like Grantham" - a reference to Margaret Thatcher's origins - (Hansard 5L, 505.1334, 7 April 1989) and arguing that the Courts and Legal Services Act (1990) disregarded "almost every principle of the methodology which law reform ought to attract" and was no less than an attempt to "nationalise the profession and part of the judiciary" (Hansard 5L, 514.151, 19 December 1989).

Towards the end of his life Hailsham suffered from depression, which he managed somewhat by his lifelong love of classical literature.

Hailsham remained an active if semi-detached member of the governing body of All Souls College almost until his death.

Honours 
In addition to his peerages, he was appointed a Companion of Honour in 1974 and was made a Knight of the Garter in 1988.

Personal life
Hailsham was married three times. He was married firstly in 1932 to Natalie Sullivan. The marriage was dissolved in 1943 after he returned from the war to find her, as he later put it in a television interview, "not alone": she was with French president Charles de Gaulle's chef de cabinet, with whom she remained until his death in 1984, dying in 1987.

On 18 April 1944, he married Mary Evelyn Martin (19 May 1919 – 10 March 1978), a descendant of the Martyn family of The Tribes of Galway. They had five offspring:

 Douglas Martin Hogg, 3rd Viscount Hailsham, QC, PC (born 5 February 1945)
 Dame Mary Claire Hogg, DBE (born 15 January 1947)
 Frances Evelyn Hogg, OBE (born 11 November 1949)
 James Richard Martin Hogg (born 1951)
 Katherine Amelia Hogg (born 18 October 1962)

Hailsham inherited Carter's Corner Place, a 17th-century house with wide views over the Pevensey marshes and the English Channel, from his father in 1950, and practised farming there for more than a decade. In 1963 he sold the property because of the cost and because his wife found the upkeep too much of a strain, but he continued to visit it thereafter.

After a happy marriage of 34 years, Mary was killed in front of her husband in a horse-riding accident during a visit to Sydney in 1978. Hailsham was distraught and blamed himself for not having reminded her to wear a hard hat. Her gravestone at All Saints, Herstmonceux, Sussex, describes her as his "radiant and joyous companion".

On 1 March 1986, Hailsham married Deirdre Margaret Shannon Aft (1928/9–1998), a former secretary in his chambers. She was the daughter of Peter Shannon, a doctor. She cared for him in his old age, but predeceased him in 1998.

Personality and disability
Hailsham retained some of the manner of a clever schoolboy – likeable, irritating and untidy – throughout his life. He was in the habit of reciting long passages of Ancient Greek verse at inappropriate moments in conversations.

As a young man Hailsham was a keen mountain-climber, and broke both his ankles while climbing the Valais Alps. The fractures (which he wrongly believed to be sprains) healed at the time. Hailsham remained physically energetic until late middle age, and in the 1960s he could often be seen cycling unsteadily around London, dressed in the bowler hat and pin-striped suit of a barrister. However, both of his damaged ankles, as he later wrote, "packed up within a week of one another in June 1974". Thereafter he was only able to walk short distances, with the aid of two walking-sticks. In old age he also suffered from arthritis.

Death and succession
On his death in October 2001, just after his 94th birthday, the viscountcy that he had disclaimed in 1963 was inherited by his elder son Douglas, who was then an MP. As a result of the House of Lords Act 1999, which removed the right of most hereditary peers to sit in the House of Lords, it was not necessary for him to disclaim his viscountcy to remain a member of the House of Commons.

Like his father and other members of the family, he was buried in the churchyard at All Saints, Herstmonceux, Sussex.

Hailsham's wealth at death was valued for probate at £4,618,511 (around £7.5m at 2018 prices).

Assessment and legacy
S. M. Cretney argues that “Hailsham was on any assessment one of the outstanding personalities of 20th-century British politics. None of his contemporaries combined so brilliant and well-trained an intellect with a capacity for oratory that enjoyed such wide appeal. His most notable success may well have been his role in reviving the Conservative Party's fortunes in the 1950s … even so, Hailsham's actual achievements in politics arguably failed to reflect his remarkable intellectual power and oratorical skills" and that given his "emotional and temperamental volatility and even instability ... it is difficult to make any rational estimate of quite what a Hailsham administration would have achieved” had he become Prime Minister in 1963.

In Jimmy McGovern's 2002 film Sunday, which portrayed the events of Bloody Sunday and the subsequent Widgery Tribunal, Hailsham was played by the actor Oliver Ford Davies.

Writings
Hogg's 1945 book The Left Was Never Right was a fierce response to two books in Victor Gollancz's "Victory Books" series, Guilty Men by Frank Owen, Michael Foot, and Peter Howard, and Your M.P. by Tom Wintringham, both published during the war and largely attempting to discredit Tory MPs as appeasers and war profiteers. The Wintringham volume had been republished in the lead up to the 1945 general election, widely acknowledged at the time as a major factor in shifting public opinion away from the Conservative party. Hogg's book sought to contrast Wintringham's statistics on appeasement with patriotic statistics of his own, maintaining that Labour MPs had been lacking in their wartime duties.

Perhaps his most important book, the Penguin paperback The Case for Conservatism, was a similar response to Labour Marches On by John Parker MP. Published in 1947 in the aftermath of the crushing Conservative election defeat of 1945, and aimed at the mass market and the layman, it presented a well-written and coherent case for Conservatism. According to the book, the role of Conservatism is not to oppose all change but to resist and balance the volatility of current political fads and ideology, and to defend a middle position that enshrines a slowly changing organic humane traditionalism. For example, in the 19th century Conservatives often opposed the policies of prevailing British liberalism, favouring factory regulation, market intervention and controls to mitigate the effects of laissez faire capitalism, but in the 20th century the role of Conservatism was to oppose an ostensible danger from the opposite direction, the regulation, intervention, and controls favoured by social democracy.

Hailsham was also known for his writings on faith and belief. In 1975 he published his spiritual autobiography The Door Wherein I Went, which included a brief chapter of Christian apologetics, using legal arguments concerning the evidence for the life of Jesus. The book included a particularly moving passage about suicide; when he was a young man his half-brother Edward Marjoribanks had taken his own life, and the experience left Hailsham with a deep conviction that suicide is always wrong.

His writings on Christianity have been the subject of discussion in the writings of Ross Clifford. Hailsham revisited themes of faith in his memoirs A Sparrow's Flight (1991), and the book's title alluded to remarks about sparrows and faith recorded in Bede's Ecclesiastical History and the words of Christ in the Gospel of Matthew.

Select bibliography
 One Year's Work. London: Hutchinson, The National Book Asssociation. 1944 (As Quintin Hogg.)
 The Times We Live In. London: Signpost Press, 1944. (As Quintin Hogg.)
 The Left Was Never Right. London: Faber and Faber, 1945. (As Quintin Hogg.)
 The Purpose of Parliament. London: Blanford Press, 1946. (As Quintin Hogg.)
 The Case for Conservatism. Harmondsworth, Middlesex: Penguin Books, 1947. (As Quintin Hogg.) Revised, updated, and republished as The Conservative Case, 1959. (As Viscount Hailsham.)
 The Iron Curtain, Fifteen Years After. With a Reprint of [Winston Churchill’s] 'The Sinews of Peace' (1946). The John Findley Green Foundation Lectures. Fulton, Missouri: Westminster College, 1961. New York: River Club, 1964. (As Viscount Hailsham.)
 Science and Government. The Fawley Foundation Lectures, 8. Southampton: University of Southampton, 1961. OCLC Number: 962124; OCoLC 594963091.  (As Quintin Hogg, Baron Hailsham of St Marylebone.)
 Science and Politics. London: Faber and Faber, 1963. Westport, Conn.: Greenwood Press, 1974. . (As Quintin Hogg, Baron Hailsham of St Marylebone.)
 The Devil's Own Song and Other Verses. London: Hodder & Stoughton, 1968. . (As Quintin Hogg.)
 New Charter: Some Proposals for Constitutional Reform. London: Conservative Political Centre, 1969. CPC Series No. 430.
 The Acceptable Face of Western Civilisation. London: Conservative Political Centre, 1973. CPC Series No. 535. .
 The Door Wherein I Went. London: Collins, 1975. . (As Lord Hailsham.)
 Elective Dictatorship. The Richard Dimbleby Lectures. London: British Broadcasting Corporation, 1976. . (As Lord Hailsham.)
 The Dilemma of Democracy: Diagnosis and Prescription. London: Collins, 1979. . (As Lord Hailsham.)
 A Sparrow's Flight: The Memoirs of Lord Hailsham of St Marylebone. London: William Collins & Sons Ltd, 1991. . (As Lord Hailsham.)
 On the Constitution. London: HarperCollins, 1992. . (As Lord Hailsham.)
 Values: Collapse and Cure. London: HarperCollins, 1994. . (As Lord Hailsham.)

Further reading
Rees, J. (John) Tudor, and Harley V. Usill, editors. They Stand Apart: A Critical Survey of the Problems of Homosexuality. London: William Heinemann, Ltd., 1955. A collection of essays by multiple authors.

Lewis, Geoffrey. Lord Hailsham: A Life. London: Jonathan Cape Ltd., 1997.

Utley, T. E. (Thomas Edwin). Not Guilty: The Conservative Reply. A Vindication of Government Policy. "Foreword by the Rt. Hon. Viscount Hailsham, Q.C." London: MacGibbon & Kee, 1957. OCLC Number: 1412752. A defence of the policies of then-Prime Minister Anthony Eden.

Clifford, Ross. Leading Lawyers' Case for the Resurrection. Edmonton, Alberta: Canadian Institute for Law, Theology, and Public Policy, 1996. . (Also published as The Case for the Empty Tomb: Leading Lawyers Look at the Resurrection. Sydney: Albatross Books, 1993. .)

Arms

References

External links

 
 The Papers of Lord Hailsham held at the Churchill Archives Centre
 Obituary – Lord Hailsham of St Marylebone from The Independent.
 
Quintin Hogg on the UK Parliament website

1907 births
2001 deaths
20th-century English lawyers
20th-century English memoirists
Burials in Sussex
Military personnel from London
Alumni of Christ Church, Oxford
British Army personnel of World War II
British Secretaries of State for Education
Chairmen of the Conservative Party (UK)
Conservative Party (UK) MPs for English constituencies
Conservative Party (UK) life peers
Contributors to Halsbury's Laws of England
English King's Counsel
English people of American descent
Fellows of All Souls College, Oxford
Fellows of the Royal Society (Statute 12)
First Lords of the Admiralty
Quintin
Knights of the Garter
Leaders of the House of Lords
Lord chancellors of Great Britain
Lord Presidents of the Council
Lords Privy Seal
Members of the Order of the Companions of Honour
Members of the Privy Council of the United Kingdom
Ministers in the Churchill caretaker government, 1945
Ministers in the Churchill wartime government, 1940–1945
Ministers in the Eden government, 1955–1957
Ministers in the Macmillan and Douglas-Home governments, 1957–1964
People associated with the University of Buckingham
People educated at Eton College
Politicians awarded knighthoods
Politicians from London
Presidents of the Oxford Union
Presidents of the Oxford University Conservative Association
Rectors of the University of Glasgow
Rifle Brigade officers
UK MPs 1935–1945
UK MPs 1945–1950
UK MPs 1950–1951
UK MPs 1959–1964
UK MPs 1964–1966
UK MPs 1966–1970
UK MPs 1970–1974
Hailsham, V2
UK MPs who were granted peerages
Viscounts Hailsham
Life peers created by Elizabeth II
Hogg 1
People educated at Sunningdale School
Presidents of the Classical Association
English religious writers